Petar Vankov is a Bulgarian football player, currently playing for FC Botev Lukovit as a defender.

External links 
  Profile

Living people
1980 births
Bulgarian footballers
Association football defenders
PFC Vidima-Rakovski Sevlievo players
FC Etar 1924 Veliko Tarnovo players
PFC Spartak Pleven players
First Professional Football League (Bulgaria) players